Crenicichla lugubris is a species of cichlid native to South America. It is found in the Amazon River basin, in the Branco, Negro and Uatumã rivers in Brazil; the Essequibo River and Branco River in Guyana; the Corantijn River in Suriname.

References

lugubris
Fish of Bolivia
Freshwater fish of Brazil
Fish of Guyana
Fish of Suriname
Fish of the Amazon basin
Fish described in 1840
Taxa named by Johann Jakob Heckel